Henry d'Harcourt (2 April 1654 – 19 October 1718) was a French noble, first Duke of Harcourt, Marshal of France, and extraordinary ambassador to Madrid.

Life 
As son of François III d'Harcourt, marquis of Beuvron and Thary-Harcourt, he was a member of the ancient House of Harcourt that dates back to the 11th century. Aged 18, he entered in the army and participated in all the wars of his time. He was present at the Battle of Sinsheim (1674), Battle of Turckheim (1675), Siege of Cambrai (1677), Siege of Philippsburg (1688) and Battle of Neerwinden (1693). In 1695 and 1696, he commanded the Army of the Moselle as a lieutenant general. 

In 1697, he was appointed extraordinary ambassador to Spain, which was in a crucial period when King Charles II of Spain died without a successor. It is unknown which role he played in the intrigues following Charles's death, but it resulted in the installation of a Bourbon on the throne of Spain. When he returned to France, the grateful Louis XIV made him a Duke in 1700 and a Marshal of France in 1703.

During the Spanish War of Succession, he commanded the Army of the Rhine in 1709, 1711, and 1712, when he suffered a stroke and was forced to retire.

Marriage and children 
He married in 1687 Marie Anne Claude Brulart de Genlis, daughter of Claude Charles Brulart and Angélique de Fabert, daughter of Abraham de Fabert.
They had 11 children, including:
 François d'Harcourt (1689–1750), 2nd Duke of Harcourt and also Marshal of France.
 Louis Henri d'Harcourt (1692–1716), comte de Beuvron, Order of the Golden Fleece. 
 Louis Abraham d'Harcourt (1694–1750), 3rd Duke of Harcourt (only for 3 months).
 Anne Pierre d'Harcourt (1701–1783), 4th Duke of Harcourt and also Marshal of France. Had issue.

Source  
 Georges Martin, Histoire et généalogie de la Maison d'Harcourt, tome 2, Lyon, l'auteur, 2013, pp. 53–54

Henry
Ambassadors of France to Spain
1654 births
1718 deaths
Marshals of France
French army commanders in the War of the Spanish Succession
Peers created by Louis XIV